J. Graham Kenion (30 July 1871 – 23 April 1942) was a sailor from the Great Britain, who represented his native country at the 1908 Summer Olympics in Hunters Quay, Great Britain. Kenion was a crew member of the British boat Mouchette, which won the silver medal in the 12-metre class.

References

External links
 
 
 

1871 births
1942 deaths
British male sailors (sport)
Sailors at the 1908 Summer Olympics – 12 Metre
Olympic sailors of Great Britain
Medalists at the 1908 Summer Olympics
Olympic silver medallists for Great Britain
Olympic medalists in sailing
People from Bebington